Following is the list of dams in Malaysia:

Johor
Bekok Dam - Juaseh Dam - Linggiu Dam - Machap Dam - Semberong Dam - Layang Dam - Lebam Dam - Labong Dam - Sultan Iskandar Reservoir

Kedah
Beris Dam - Pedu Dam - Muda Dam - Ahning Dam

Kelantan
Pergau Dam

Kuala Lumpur
Klang Gates Dam

Malacca
Jus Dam - Durian Tunggal Reservoir

Negeri Sembilan
Gemencheh Dam - Kelinchi Dam - Sungai Terip Dam

Pahang
Anak Endau Dam - Chematu Dam - Chereh Dam - Chini Dam - Kelau Dam - Pontian Dam - Sultan Abu Bakar Dam

Penang

Air Itam Dam - Mengkuang Dam - Teluk Bahang Dam

Perak
Bersia Dam - Chenderoh Power Station (Chenderoh Dam) - Kenering Dam - Piah Dam - Temenggor Dam - Gopeng Dam - Mahang Dam - Jor Dam

Perlis
Timah Tasoh Dam

Sabah
Babagon Dam - Kaiduan Dam - Tenom Pangi Dam

Sarawak

Bakun Dam
Baram Dam (proposed)
Batang Ai Dam 
Bengoh Dam
Gerugu Dam 
Murum Dam

Selangor
Batu Dam - Langat Dam - Selangor Dam - Semenyih Dam - Tasik Subang Dam - Tinggi Dam

Terengganu
Kenyir Dam (Sultan Mahmud Power Station)

Malaysia
Dams